The Robinson projection is a map projection of a world map which shows the entire world at once. It was specifically created in an attempt to find a good compromise to the problem of readily showing the whole globe as a flat image.

The Robinson projection was devised by Arthur H. Robinson in 1963 in response to an appeal from the Rand McNally company, which has used the projection in general-purpose world maps since that time. Robinson published details of the projection's construction in 1974. The National Geographic Society (NGS) began using the Robinson projection for general-purpose world maps in 1988, replacing the Van der Grinten projection. In 1998 NGS abandoned the Robinson projection for that use in favor of the Winkel tripel projection, as the latter "reduces the distortion of land masses as they near the poles".

Strengths and weaknesses
The Robinson projection is neither equal-area nor conformal, abandoning both for a compromise. The creator felt that this produced a better overall view than could be achieved by adhering to either. The meridians curve gently, avoiding extremes, but thereby stretch the poles into long lines instead of leaving them as points.

Hence, distortion close to the poles is severe, but quickly declines to moderate levels moving away from them. The straight parallels imply severe angular distortion at the high latitudes toward the outer edges of the map – a fault inherent in any pseudocylindrical projection. However, at the time it was developed, the projection effectively met Rand McNally's goal to produce appealing depictions of the entire world.

Formulation
The projection is defined by the table:

The table is indexed by latitude at 5-degree intervals; intermediate values are calculated using interpolation. Robinson did not specify any particular interpolation method, but it is reported that others used either Aitken interpolation (with polynomials of unknown degrees) or cubic splines while analyzing area deformation on the Robinson projection. The X column is the ratio of the length of the parallel to the length of the equator; the Y column can be multiplied by 0.2536 to obtain the ratio of the distance of that parallel from the equator to the length of the equator.

Coordinates of points on a map are computed as follows:

where R is the radius of the globe at the scale of the map, λ is the longitude of the point to plot, and λ0 is the central meridian chosen for the map (both λ and λ0 are expressed in radians).

Simple consequences of these formulas are:
 With x computed as constant multiplier to the meridian across the entire parallel, meridians of longitude are thus equally spaced along the parallel.
 With y having no dependency on longitude, parallels are straight horizontal lines.

Applications 
The Central Intelligence Agency World Factbook uses the Robinson projection in its political and physical world maps.

The European Centre for Disease Prevention and Control recommends using the Robinson projection for mapping the whole world.

See also

 List of map projections
 Cartography
 Kavrayskiy VII

References

Further reading 
Arthur H. Robinson (1974). "A New Map Projection: Its Development and Characteristics". In: International Yearbook of Cartography. Vol 14, 1974, pp. 145–155.
John B. Garver Jr. (1988). "New Perspective on the World". In: National Geographic, December 1988, pp. 911–913.
John P. Snyder (1993). Flattening The Earth—2000 Years of Map Projections, The University of Chicago Press. pp. 214–216.

External links

 Table of examples and properties of all common projections, from radicalcartography.net
 Numerical evaluation of the Robinson projection, from Cartography and Geographic Information Science, April, 2004 by Cengizhan Ipbuker

Map projections